Roger Williams Park is an elaborately landscaped  city park in Providence, Rhode Island and a historic district listed on the National Register of Historic Places.  It is named after Roger Williams, the founder of the city of Providence and the primary founder of the state of Rhode Island.

History
The land for the park was a gift to the people of Providence in 1872, in accordance with the will of Betsey Williams, the last descendant of Roger Williams to inherit his land. It had been the family farm and was the last of the original land granted to Roger Williams in 1638 by Canonicus, chief of the Narragansett tribe. The family farmhouse was built in 1773 and is now known as the Betsey Williams Cottage; the cottage and the Williams family burial ground (including Betsey's grave) are still maintained within the park.

The original bequest consisted of about 100 acres. Additional land to the south was purchased in 1891 at a cost of $359,000, consisting mostly of unimproved land that was covered with woods and ponds; it brought the total area of the park to about 400 acres. The natural history museum opened in 1895.

2016 renovations
The Rhode Island Foundation began a renovation effort in the park in 2016 as a celebration of their centennial, beginning with the park's historic bandstand in December 2016. The renovations will expand to other park buildings and entrances. In June 2017, a dedicated bike and pedestrian lane was added to Frederick Green Memorial Boulevard as part of these renovations, although this change was opposed by some Cranston residents, including Cranston mayor Allan Fung.

Gateway visitor center

In Fall 2022, a Gateway and Visitor Center for the park opened on Broad Street. Designed by INFORM studio, the center is intended to increase community access to the park. The center provides information about public events, amenities, and services in Roger Williams Park and in the surrounding neighborhood.

Layout
It was designed by Horace Cleveland in 1878 and was constructed in the 1880s. Many of the roads, bridges, and sidewalks were built by the Works Progress Administration from 1935 to 1940. The National Trust for Historic Preservation called Roger Williams Park one of the finest urban parks in the US in their 2000 annual report.

It contains:
 The Gateway Visitor Center on Broad Street
 The Roger Williams Park Zoo
 The Roger Williams Park Museum of Natural History and Planetarium
 The Roger Williams Park Botanical Center
 Japanese Gardens
 Victorian Rose Gardens
 The Providence Police Department's Mounted Command center
 The Dalrymple Boathouse and boat rentals
 historical tours
 a Carousel Village 
 The "Hasbro Boundless Playground" which is accessible for handicapped children
 The Temple to Music
 The Roger Williams Park Casino
 many miles of walking paths

Images

See also
 Roger Williams Park Zoo, third oldest in the U.S., and one of the top 20 zoos in the country
 Roger Williams National Memorial, a distinct park in downtown Providence
 Prospect Terrace Park, park located in Providence's College Hill neighborhood
National Register of Historic Places listings in Providence, Rhode Island

Notes
 Her headstone name is spelled as "Betsey Williams," but she has been mistakenly called "Betsy" through the centuries, as it appears on numerous articles, postcards, and books.

References

External links

Roger Williams Park Map

Parks in Rhode Island
Geography of Providence, Rhode Island
Works Progress Administration in Rhode Island
Protected areas of Providence County, Rhode Island
Tourist attractions in Providence, Rhode Island
Historic districts on the National Register of Historic Places in Rhode Island
1872 establishments in Rhode Island
National Register of Historic Places in Providence, Rhode Island
Parks on the National Register of Historic Places in Rhode Island